Julius Nicholas Boros (March 3, 1920 – May 28, 1994) was an American professional golfer noted for his effortless-looking swing and strong record on difficult golf courses, particularly at the U.S. Open.

Early years
Born in Fairfield, Connecticut, Boros was of Hungarian descent, and played varsity baseball in college. He worked as an accountant, played high-standard amateur golf, and turned professional in 1949 at age 29.

Professional career
Boros won 18 PGA Tour events, including three major championships: the 1952 and 1963 U.S. Opens and the 1968 PGA Championship. He won his first by four strokes in the heat at the Northwood Club in Dallas, also his first PGA Tour victory, which interrupted the U.S. Open streak of 36-hole leader Ben Hogan for a year. In the windy 1963 U.S. Open near Boston, Boros defeated Arnold Palmer and Jacky Cupit in a playoff, after all had finished the 72 holes at a post-war record nine over par.

For over a half century, Boros was the oldest player to win a modern major, taking the 1968 PGA Championship in San Antonio by a stroke at age 48. One of the runners-up was Palmer, who never won the PGA Championship to complete his career grand slam. The previous oldest winner of a major was Old Tom Morris, age 46 in the 1867 Open Championship. 
Boros' mark was surpassed by Phil Mickelson, who won the PGA Championship in 2021 at age fifty.

Boros' best results among the majors were at the U.S. Open, with nine top-five finishes; he contended in that championship as late as 1973 at age 53, and tied for seventh.

Boros was a member of the Ryder Cup team in 1959, 1963, 1965, and 1967. He was PGA Player of the Year in 1952 and 1963, and his total career PGA Tour earnings were $1,004,861. Boros was inducted into the World Golf Hall of Fame in 1982.

While other players often walked around a hole and studied the green for several minutes before putting – sometimes from their knees, Boros is remembered for not wasting any time on either the greens or the fairways. He would walk up to the ball and "just do it". Noted for his relaxed, nonchalant-looking swing and manner, he is remembered for his catchphrase "swing easy, hit hard." Boros had an exceptional short game.

Boros was also instrumental in starting the Senior PGA Tour in the late 1970s. The exciting televised playoff victory of Boros and partner Roberto De Vicenzo over Tommy Bolt and Art Wall Jr. at the Legends of Golf tournament in 1979 raised the profile of professional senior golf competition.

Family
Boros' first wife, Buttons Cosgrove, died in childbirth in 1951. Boros and his second wife, Armen, had seven children: four sons and three daughters. His son Guy Boros won on the PGA Tour in 1996, at the Greater Vancouver Open in late August.

Death
Boros suffered a fatal heart attack in 1994 on the golf course at the Coral Ridge Country Club in Fort Lauderdale, Florida. He was found sitting in a golf cart under a willow tree by two club members near the 16th hole, his favorite spot on the course. He was survived by his wife Armen, sons Julius Jr., Gary, Guy, and Nick, daughters Joy, Gay, and Jody, and five grandchildren.

Professional wins (25)

PGA Tour wins (18)

PGA Tour playoff record (4–6)

Other wins (4)
This list may be incomplete
1951 Massachusetts Open
1956 Carolinas PGA Championship
1964 Carolinas PGA Championship
1979 South Florida PGA Championship

Senior wins (3)
1971 PGA Seniors' Championship
1977 PGA Seniors' Championship
1979 Legends of Golf (with Roberto De Vicenzo)

Major championships

Wins (3)

1Defeated Jacky Cupit and Arnold Palmer in an 18-hole playoff - Boros 70 (-1), Cupit 73 (+2), Palmer 76 (+5).

Results timeline

CUT = missed the half-way cut
WD = withdrew
"T" = tied

Summary

Most consecutive cuts made – 14 (1950 Masters – 1956 U.S. Open)
Longest streak of top-10s – 4 (1951 U.S. Open – 1953 Masters)

U.S. national team appearances
Professional
Ryder Cup: 1959 (winners), 1963 (winners), 1965 (winners), 1967 (winners)
World Cup: 1953, 1968
Hopkins Trophy: 1952 (winners), 1953 (winners)

See also

List of golfers with most PGA Tour wins
List of men's major championships winning golfers

References

External links

American male golfers
PGA Tour golfers
Ryder Cup competitors for the United States
Winners of men's major golf championships
World Golf Hall of Fame inductees
Golfers from Connecticut
Sportspeople from Fairfield, Connecticut
American people of Hungarian descent
1920 births
1994 deaths